Robert Jezek (born 6 April 1955) is a Canadian stage, film and television actor based in the United Kingdom.

Career
In 1989, Jezek appeared as Sergeant Zbrigniev in the Doctor Who television serial Battlefield.

He is known for playing companion Frobisher in a range of Doctor Who audio dramas produced by Big Finish Productions and based on the BBC television series Doctor Who. In 2002, he guest-starred in Sarah Jane Smith: Ghost Town, an audio drama produced by the same company. He also lent his voice to the videogame The Getaway: Black Monday in 2004.

He has also had minor roles in films including playing a Rescue 1 technician in Event Horizon (1997) a police officer in Casino Royale (2006) and the Polish neighbour in Last Chance Harvey (2008). He has also appeared in a number of short films.

In April 2011, he appeared in British soap opera EastEnders, as the Polish father of a girl who was bullying Ben Mitchell (then Charlie Jones). He meets with Phil Mitchell (Steve McFadden) and Shirley Carter (Linda Henry) to discuss Tasha bullying Ben, and he agrees to talk to her. Ben since told Zsa Zsa Carter that Tasha is giving him no more problems.

He has also had guest appearances in British television dramas Shameless, The Bill and Holby City.

Jezek played the title role in the world theatre premier of Hayton on Homicide (2009) and is currently appearing in the West End in The Bodyguard.

Filmography

External links
robertjezek.com Robert Jezek official website

Living people
Canadian male film actors
Canadian male stage actors
Canadian male television actors
Canadian male voice actors
Place of birth missing (living people)
Canadian expatriates in England
1955 births